The 1972 Madison Dukes football team was an American football team that represented James Madison University during the 1972 NCAA College Division football season as an independent. The Dukes, in their first season, were coached by Challace McMillin and compiled a record of 0–4–1.

Schedule

References

Madison
James Madison Dukes football seasons
College football winless seasons
Madison Dukes football